Pipistrellus is a genus of bats in the family Vespertilionidae and subfamily Vespertilioninae. The name of the genus is derived from the Italian word , meaning "bat" (from Latin  "bird of evening, bat").

The size of the genus has been considerably reduced as a result of work during the 1990s and 2000s, with genera  such as Arielulus, Hypsugo, Falsistrellus, Neoromicia, Parastrellus, Perimyotis, Scotozous, and Vespadelus being split off. Still, molecular evidence suggests the genus is not monophyletic. Several other genera in the subfamily Vespertilioninae have also been merged with Pipistrellus in previous classifications. Species in the genus may be referred to as "pipistrelles" or "pipistrelle bats", though these terms are also used for species now placed in other genera, such as the western pipistrelle (Parastrellus hesperus) and eastern pipistrelle (Perimyotis subflavus) of North America. Species of the Southern Hemisphere separated to genus Falsistrellus are sometimes referred to as false pipistrelle or falsistrelle.

They are somewhat distinguished from their much larger relatives, the noctule bats Nyctalus by their weak, fluttery flight reminiscent of a butterfly, though a few species are more direct in their flight.

Species
Japanese pipistrelle, P. abramus
Forest pipistrelle, P. adamsi
Mount Gargues pipistrelle, P. aero
Anchieta's pipistrelle, P. anchietae
Angulate pipistrelle, P. angulatus
Kelaart's pipistrelle, P. ceylonicus
Greater Papuan pipistrelle, P. collinus
Indian pipistrelle, P.  coromandra
Crete pipistrelle, P. creticus
Dhofar pipistrelle, P. dhofarensis
Endo's pipistrelle, P. endoi
Hanak's dwarf bat, P. hanaki
Dusky pipistrelle, P. hesperidus
Aellen's pipistrelle, P. inexspectatus
Java pipistrelle, P. javanicus
Kuhl's pipistrelle, P. kuhlii
Madeira pipistrelle, P. maderensis
Minahassa pipistrelle, P. minahassae
†Christmas Island pipistrelle, P.  murrayi (extinct, last sighted in August 2009)
Tiny pipistrelle, P. nanulus
Nathusius's pipistrelle, P. nathusii
Lesser Papuan pipistrelle, P. papuanus
Mount Popa pipistrelle, P. paterculus
Dar es Salaam pipistrelle, P. permixtus
Common pipistrelle, P. pipistrellus
Soprano pipistrelle, P. pygmaeus
Racey's pipistrelle, P. raceyi
Rüppell's pipistrelle, P. rueppellii
Rusty pipistrelle, P. rusticus
Simandou pipistrelle, P. simandouensis
Narrow-winged pipistrelle, P. stenopterus
†Sturdee's pipistrelle, P. sturdeei (extinct 2000)
Least pipistrelle, P. tenuis
Watts's pipistrelle, P. wattsi
Northern pipistrelle or Koopman's pipistrelle, P. westralis

References

External links

 
Bat genera
Taxa named by Johann Jakob Kaup